Mountain viper may refer to:

 Macrovipera lebetinus, a.k.a. the Levant viper, a venomous species found in North Africa, much of the Middle East, and as far east as Kashmir
 Ovophis monticola, a.k.a. the mountain pitviper, a venomous species found in Asia 
 Montivipera xanthina, a.k.a. the Ottoman viper, a venomous species found in northeastern Greece and Turkey, as well as certain islands in the Aegean Sea
 Vipera monticola, the Atlas mountain viper, a venomous species endemic in Morocco

Animal common name disambiguation pages